Groud may refer to:
 Groud (mathematics), an algebraic structure
 Gilbert G. Groud, African artist